Hermann Neubacher (24 June 1893 – 1 July 1960) was an Austrian Nazi politician who held a number of diplomatic posts in the Third Reich. During the Second World War, he was appointed as the leading German foreign ministry official for Greece and the Balkans (including Serbia, Albania and Montenegro).

Austrian activism
Born in Wels, he was educated in Kremsmünster and Vienna before his service on the Italian Front in World War I. Initially connected to the Social Democratic Party of Austria through his friendship with a number of leading members whilst in charge of a housing project in Vienna, Neubacher became attracted to Pan-Germanism and in 1925 founded his own Österreichisch-Deutscher Volksbund as a society for this school of thought. He was also a member of the Deutsche Gemeinschaft secret society and in this group he built up friendships with fellow members Engelbert Dollfuß and Arthur Seyss-Inquart.

Neubacher became a member of the Nazi Party in Austria because he felt it was the best way to bring about Anschluss, although he was more in tune with the Anton Reinthaller-led moderate faction than the extremists under Theodor Habicht. After a spell as assistant to Josef Leopold he became Landesleiter of the Austrian Nazi party in 1935, attempting to restructure the banned group. His tenure came to an end the same year when he was imprisoned for distributing illegal material and upon his release, he dropped out of politics to take up a role with IG Farben.

Under the Nazis he was chosen to serve as Mayor of Vienna, although he soon incurred disfavor for his habit of working with former Social Democrats and his lax attitude towards the Jews and before long he was downgraded to the role of general representative of Josef Bürckel.

Greece

When war broke out Neubacher took on the role of a special plenipotentiary envoy in the Balkans and Greece, initially serving as an economic adviser in Romania before taking on the role of ambassador to the same country and afterwards Greece as well. In Greece he was joined by Italian Alberto D'Agostino, with the two men given full authority over economic and financial matters after discussions between the Greek government and the occupiers aimed at reducing occupation costs. Neubacher was the general manager of DEGRIGES a German monopoly company for trade in Greece.

During the final days of the occupation of Greece the more moderate Neubacher became embroiled in a struggle with Sicherheitspolizei chief Walter Blume, after Blume suggested that the Nazis should undertake a policy of executing all members of the political elite suspected of having links to the United Kingdom, so as to leave the country leaderless (the so-called "Chaos thesis"). Neubacher rejected this as counterproductive, arguing that as long as politicians opposed the work of the communist-controlled National Liberation Front and the Greek People's Liberation Army their British ties would not help them in establishing control. In the end Neubacher's line was approved and Blume was withdrawn, a move that ultimately left in place a strong anti-communist right wing governing class in post-liberation Greece.

Yugoslavia

In 1943 he devised the Neubacher Plan as a means to improve German occupation in the Balkans. In a wide-ranging raft of reforms Neubacher suggested five main ideas to Joachim von Ribbentrop. These were:
 The re-unification of Montenegro and Serbia in a federal type of state.
 Installing General Milan Nedić as President of the resulting Greater Serbia.
 Autonomy in Montenegro.
 The re-opening of the University of Belgrade and an end to German supervision of cultural life.
 Reduction in German military presence and the establishment of a gendarmerie controlled by the new government.
Ultimately only point 4 of his proposals was approved, although he did succeed in ending German military reprisals and in combating to an extent the Ustaše genocide against Serbs.

Later life
After the war Neubacher faced trial in the Socialist Federal Republic of Yugoslavia and in 1946 a military court in Belgrade sentenced him to 20 years of hard labor, although he was not ultimately required to serve the full sentence. He served his prison term in Belgrade, in the building of the former Gestapo headquarters.  He was released from prison in November 1952 due to poor health. Back in Austria, he worked as a building constructor in Salzburg, and from 1954–1956, he worked in Ethiopia as a consultant to Emperor Haile Selasie. He died in Vienna, aged 67.

References

External links

 

1893 births
1960 deaths
People from Wels
Austrian diplomats
Austrian Nazis
Mayors of Vienna
Austro-Hungarian military personnel of World War I
Austrian anti-communists
Recipients of the Knights Cross of the War Merit Cross
Prisoners and detainees of Yugoslavia
German occupation of Greece during World War II
Nazi politicians